Berwyn North School District 98 is a school district headquartered in Berwyn, Illinois, United States.

The district serves the northern half of Berwyn.

Residents move on to J. Sterling Morton High School West of the J. Sterling Morton High School District 201 after completion of the 8th grade.

Schools

Secondary Schools
 Lincoln Middle School (6-8)

Primary schools
 .Havlicek Elementary School (K-5)
 Jefferson Elementary School (K-5)
 Prairie Oak Elementary School (K-5)

See also
List of school districts in Illinois

References

External links
 

School districts in Cook County, Illinois
Berwyn, Illinois